Frédéric Charles du Hen (27 May 1903 – 8 April 1992) was a Dutch middle-distance runner. He competed in the men's 1500 metres at the 1928 Summer Olympics.

References

1903 births
1992 deaths
Athletes (track and field) at the 1928 Summer Olympics
Dutch male middle-distance runners
Olympic athletes of the Netherlands
Sportspeople from Dordrecht